The Estadio Municipal de La Línea de la Concepción is a multi-purpose stadium located in La Línea de la Concepción, Cádiz Province, Spain. 
It is currently used for football matches and is the home stadium of Real Balompédica Linense.

On 15 October 1969, it hosted Spain's 6–0 win over Finland in the 1970 FIFA World Cup qualification. On 7 June 1984, Spain played a friendly against Yugoslavia at the ground, and lost 0–1. On 21 March 2018, Andorra played a friendly against Liechtenstein, in which the former won 1–0.

References

External links
Worldstadiums profile 
RB Linense profile on Futbolme 
Estadios de España 

Football venues in Andalusia
Real Balompédica Linense
Buildings and structures in the Province of Cádiz
La Línea de la Concepción
Sports venues completed in 1969